The Neridé Prague indoor was played on indoor hard courts. It was part of ATP Challenger Series. It was held at Průhonice, Prague in Czech Republic since 2000.

Past finals

Men's singles

Men's doubles

See also
 Czech Indoor Open

References

External links

2000 edition on tennislive

2000 edition on ITF Website

2001 edition on tennislive

 2001 edition on ITF Website

2002 edition on tennislive

Neridé Prague Indoor
ATP Challenger Tour
Hard court tennis tournaments
Indoor hard court tennis tournaments
Defunct tennis tournaments in the Czech Republic